Christian de Montmorency-Luxembourg (9 February 1675 – 23 November 1746), prince of Tingry, count of Beaumont and count of Luxe, was a marshal of France (1734).

He was the 4th son of marshal François-Henri de Montmorency-Luxembourg, duke of Piney and Madeleine de Clermont-Tonnerre. He played a decisive role in the battle of Denain in 1712. In 1722 he commissioned the building of hôtel Matignon.

References 
 L'art de vérifier les dates des faits historiques, des chartes, des chroniques ...- de David Bailie Warden, Saint-Allais (Nicolas Viton), Maur François Dantine, Charles Clémencet, Ursin Durand, François Clément - 1818

1675 births
1746 deaths
Christian Louis
Marshals of France
French army commanders in the War of the Spanish Succession